Oreochromis karongae is a critically endangered species of cichlid that is endemic to Lake Malawi, Lake Malombe, and upper and middle Shire River in Malawi, Mozambique, and Tanzania. This species is important to local commercial fisheries, but has declined drastically due to overfishing.

Breeding males are black with white edges to the fins and are extremely similar to breeding male O. lidole, while females are more yellowish-brown than females of O. lidole and O. squamipinnis.

It is part of the subgenus Nyasalapia, which are known as chambo. A taxonomic review recommended that O. saka should be considered a synonym of O. karongae (the two only differ by pharyngeal bones and teeth), but at present both are considered valid by FishBase.

The breeding males of chambo have long genital tassels that somewhat resemble fish eggs. During breeding, the female attempts to pick them up with her mouth and this helps the male in fertilizing the female's eggs, already in her mouth. O. karongae mainly feeds on phytoplankton, including diatoms.

The lepidophagous cichlid Corematodus shiranus is an aggressive mimic of chambo in both color pattern and swimming mode. It is, therefore, able to approach unsuspecting schools of chambo and rapidly take a mouthful of scales or fin.

References

Karongae
Fish of Lake Malawi
Endangered animals
Endangered biota of Africa
Fish described in 1941
Taxonomy articles created by Polbot